Church of the Holy Trinity v. United States, 143 U.S. 457 (1892), was a decision of the Supreme Court of the United States regarding an employment contract between The Church of the Holy Trinity, New York and an English (Anglican) priest.

1885 law 
Contracts to import labor were forbidden by Federal law, and specifically by the Alien Contract Labor Law, an Act of Congress passed in 1885 prohibiting "the importation and migration of foreigners and aliens under contract or agreement to perform labor or service of any kind in the United States, its territories, and the District of Columbia".

Court decision 
The court held that a minister was not a foreign laborer under the statute even though he was a foreigner.  Page 143 U. S. 471 includes the following quotes:

The court used the soft plain meaning rule to interpret the statute in this case. Justice David Josiah Brewer made a principle of statutory construction that "It is a familiar rule, that a thing may be within the letter of the statute and yet not within the statute, because not within its spirit, nor within the intention of its makers." Its decision stated that "the circuit court did err when it held that the contract hiring an English rector was within the prohibition of the statute, which disallowed a '... person, company, partnership, or corporation, in any manner whatsoever to prepay the transportation, or in any way assist or encourage the importation or migration, of any alien or aliens, any foreigner or foreigners, into the United States ... under contract or agreement ... to perform labor or service of any kind in the United States.

Christian nation 

The case is famous for Brewer's statements that America is a "Christian nation".

In a 1905 book titled: The United States: A Christian Nation, Brewer explained further:

Legislative intent 

This case is cited most often in legal cases for its holding on how legislative intent can be determined.  For example, in the case of [[United Steelworkers v. Weber|United Steelworkers of America v. Weber]], 443 U.S. 193 (1979), in which the Supreme Court held that the prohibitions against racial discrimination in Title VII of the Civil Rights Act of 1964 did not bar all affirmative action programs by private employers which favored racial minorities, the Supreme Court quoted, as part of its analysis, Holy Trinity's principle of statutory interpretation that "[i]t is a 'familiar rule, that a thing may be within the letter of the statute and yet not within the statute, because not within its spirit, nor within the intention of its makers. Weber, 443 U.S. at 201, quoting Holy Trinity, 143 U.S. at 459.  The Weber Court said that the language of Title VII "must therefore be read against the background of the legislative history of Title VII and the historical context from which the Act arose". Id.Justice Antonin Scalia, referring to the holding in the Holy Trinity decision as the "prototypical case" in which a judge follows the intent of the legislature rather than the text of the statute, wrote that this was in opposition to his judicial philosophy of textualism. The textualist position holds that courts should follow the text of a law rather than attempt to read exceptions into the law in accordance with the legislative intent. Scalia has thus criticized the principle of the Holy Trinity case as "nothing but an invitation to judicial lawmaking".

In Public Citizen v. Department of Justice'', 491 U.S. 440 (1989), Justice Anthony Kennedy, joined by Chief Justice William Rehnquist and Justice Sandra Day O'Connor, rejected this approach to determining congressional intent. Kennedy wrote:

See also

History of religion in the United States
List of United States Supreme Court cases, volume 143

References

External links

 
Language and Law on Holy Trinity Church v. U.S. (1892)

1892 in United States case law
United States Supreme Court cases
United States Supreme Court cases of the Fuller Court
United States statutory interpretation case law
United States immigration and naturalization case law
Episcopal Diocese of New York